Norman Adams may refer to:

 Norman Adams (American artist) (1933–2014), American commercial artist and illustrator
 Norman Adams (British artist) (1927–2005), British artist and professor of painting